Milesia conspicua is a species of hoverfly in the family Syrphidae.

Distribution
Malaysia, Thailand.

References

Insects described in 1928
Eristalinae
Diptera of Asia
Taxa named by Charles Howard Curran